Merlin Jay Olsen (September 15, 1940 – March 11, 2010) was an American football player, announcer, and actor. For his entire 15-year professional football career he was a defensive tackle with the Los Angeles Rams in the National Football League (NFL).  He was selected to play in the Pro Bowl 14 times — every year but his last. The only other football players to have matched that number are the former offensive lineman Bruce Matthews, the former tight end Tony Gonzalez, and the former quarterback Peyton Manning. (Tom Brady is the only NFL player to have played more times in the Pro Bowl, with 15 selections.)

In 1961, Olsen received the Outland Trophy, awarded to as the best lineman of the year in college football. He is a member of the Pro Football Hall of Fame and the College Football Hall of Fame. As an actor, he portrayed a farmer, Jonathan Garvey, on Little House on the Prairie. After leaving that series, he starred in his own NBC drama, Father Murphy.

Early life
Merlin Olsen was born in Logan, Utah, where his parents Merle Barrus and Lynn Jay Olsen graduated from Utah State University (USU) and began their careers. His father was a professor at the university while his mother had graduated in elementary education. Merlin was the second of nine siblings and the first-born son. The family opened their home to host, feed, sleep or tutor anyone in the neighborhood; during the winter, Merle would lay wood over the entrance of the house so that ice skaters from the local park could walk in.

Merlin pursued athletics in high school but was cut from the basketball team while in grade 9, told by the coach that athletics wasn't for him and that he should take up the arts. Later, Olsen turned down a football scholarship to Stanford University to play for USU. Classmate Ross Peterson described him as a "natural, big, strong leader ... he could have been successful at anything". His brothers Phil and Orrin also played football.

Education 
Olsen attended Utah State University where he became a member of the Sigma Chi fraternity, and was a three-year letterman in football as a defensive tackle. He graduated from the College of Business and Social Sciences at USU with a bachelor's degree in finance in 1962 and a master's degree in economics in 1971. He later received an honorary doctorate degree in business from the Huntsman School.

In football, as a senior, he was a consensus All-American selection (making the vast majority of All-America teams) and was the winner of the Outland Trophy. After Olsen's junior year of 1960 he was also named All-American by the Football Writers Association of America and Newspaper Enterprise Association. He was also All-Conference in both 1960 and 1961. Olsen and Utah State were in the 1960 Sun Bowl, losing to New Mexico State, 20–13. Led by Olsen, the Aggie defense held the New Mexico State Aggies to just 44 rushing yards on 32 carries.

The Aggie defense Olsen anchored as a senior gave up an average of 50.8 rushing yards (which led the nation), 88.6 passing yards, and 139.4 total yards which all still stand as school records for defense. The 1961 Aggie defense gave up an average 7.8 points a game, which is second in team history behind Olsen's 1960 team, which allowed 6.5 points per game. Additionally, the Aggie defense held four opponents to less than 100 total yards. One, the University of Idaho, was held to a school-record 23 total yards, with the Aggies winning 69–0.

The Aggies, not known as a national power football program, finished 10th in both the AP and UPI post-season polls, the only time that has occurred in school history. The Aggies had a combined 18–3–1 record during Olsen's junior and senior seasons under coach John Ralston and were conference champions those two seasons as well.

He was a member of the Utah State University chapter of the Sigma Chi fraternity, which has an annual Merlin Olsen Day of Service named in his honor where brothers are encouraged to give back to their communities.

Awards and honors
Olsen played in the East-West Shrine Game in 1961 and in 2003 was voted to the game's Hall of Fame. He also played in the Hula Bowl after his senior season and was voted MVP of the game.

Olsen is a member of the State of Utah's Sports Hall of Fame, the Utah State University Sports Hall of Fame and USU's All-Century Football Team. In 2000, he was selected by Sports Illustrated as one of the State of Utah's Top 50 Athletes of the Century. He was voted to the All-Academic All-America Hall of Fame in 1988. In 1969, he was voted to the Newspaper Enterprise Association All-Time All-America team with collegiate greats such as Bronko Nagurski, Red Grange, Jim Thorpe, and O. J. Simpson, among others.

In 2008, Olsen was named to the 75th Anniversary All-Sun Bowl Team to commemorate the Sun Bowl Association's Diamond Anniversary.

Utah State University announced the intention to name its football field after Olsen during a ceremony in Logan during halftime of the USU-St. Mary's basketball game on December 5, 2009.

Olsen also was a three-time academic All-American at Utah State and graduated summa cum laude in 1962 with a degree in finance.

Career

Professional football 
Coming out of college, Olsen had offers from both the Los Angeles Rams of the National Football League and the Denver Broncos of the rival American Football League. He chose the security of the NFL and signed with the Rams. Olsen's first contract was for around $50,000 for two years, plus a signing bonus. It was 1962, and the average football player salary at the time was around $12,000 a year. He was the first USU Aggie to be drafted in the 1st round of the NFL draft.

Olsen played professionally (1962–1976) for the Los Angeles Rams of the National Football League.  A leading defensive star of his era, he missed only two games in his 15-season NFL career. He was named the NFL's Rookie of the Year in 1962 and was First-team All-Pro in 1964, and 1966 through 1970. He was voted Second-team All-Pro in 1965, 1973 and 1974.

Olsen almost ended up on offense, but was later moved to the defensive line after a few experiments in practice. Soon he became part of one of the best front fours in NFL history. Deacon Jones, Rosey Grier, and Lamar Lundy joined Olsen on the defensive line in 1963 that was nicknamed "The Fearsome Foursome". He was named the AP NFL Defensive Player of the Week for week 12 in 1965. Olsen scored his first touchdown in that game.

Throughout the 1960s, this quartet terrorized opposing offenses. Olsen's play helped the Rams to the playoffs in 1967 and 1969. He was voted the club's Outstanding Defensive Lineman from 1967 to 1970 by the Los Angeles Rams Alumni. In week 14, 1967, Olsen and the rest of the Fearsome Foursome were named the AP NFL Defensive Players of the Week for their performance against the Baltimore Colts. In the 1970s, Olsen continued his dominant play at defensive tackle and his 11 sacks in 1972 were second on the team. After week 8 in 1972, Olsen was named the Associated Press NFL Defensive Player of the Week for the third time in his career.

The Rams won the NFC West crown in 1973 through 1976 thanks in part to the play of Olsen. They ranked first in the NFL in run defense in 1973 and 1974 and finished second in sacking opposing passers both years. In 1973 Olsen was voted the NFLPA NFC Defensive Lineman of the Year and the next season, 1974, he was the recipient of Bert Bell Award as the NFL MVP as voted by the Maxwell Club. Olsen accepted the award "on behalf of all who toil in the NFL trenches".

Three of the Olsen brothers, Merlin, Phil, and Orrin, played in the NFL, with Merlin and Phil playing together for the Rams from 1971 to 1974. A nephew, Hans, son of his brother, Clark, also played professional football. In 1975 and 1976, the Rams defense finished second in the NFL against the run while ranking in the top five in sacking opposing quarterbacks and compiling a 22-5-1 record over those two seasons.

Olsen's last game was the NFC Championship game in 1976 at Bloomington, Minnesota. The Vikings took advantage on a freak play early in the game. A blocked field goal returned 90 yards for a touchdown shocked the Rams in the first quarter. The defense was later victimized by a couple of big plays by the Vikings. The Rams came up short, losing 24–13, bringing the storied career of the Rams' finest defensive tackle to an end.

Olsen made the Pro Bowl a then-record 14 times, missing it only in his final year. He was inducted into the Pro Football Hall of Fame in 1982 in his first year of eligibility; he selected his college position coach Tony Knap as his presenter. In 1999, Olsen was ranked 25th on The Sporting News''' list of the 100 Greatest Football Players.

 Entertainment 
Olsen enjoyed continued success after the NFL as a broadcaster, actor, and businessman.

Olsen served as a television color commentator, teaming mostly with Dick Enberg on NBC's coverage of the AFC during the late 1970s and almost all of the 1980s. He and Enberg also teamed for four Super Bowls (XV, XVII, XX and XXIII), as well as nine Rose Bowls from 1980 to 1988. Olsen also worked Super Bowl XIII in 1979 with Curt Gowdy and John Brodie (Enberg was then serving as pre-game/halftime/post-game host). In 1989, Olsen was replaced by Bill Walsh as NBC's lead NFL color commentator. For the 1989 season, Olsen worked with Charlie Jones on NBC's broadcasts. In 1990 and 1991, he moved to CBS Sports doing NFL games with Dick Stockton.

Olsen developed a successful career as an actor. He appeared as the character Little George in the John Wayne movie, The Undefeated, with Rams teammate Roman Gabriel, in 1969.

In 1970, he appeared once on Petticoat Junction, in the episode: "With This Ring".  He played mountaineer Merlin Fergus.

When Little House on the Prairie actor Victor French left to star in his own comedy Carter Country in 1977, Olsen was tapped to play Michael Landon's new sidekick Jonathan Garvey for several years. One memorable quote from his character's son, Andy Garvey, "My pa doesn't know anything about football!" came when Andy's friends suggested that Jonathan coach their football team.

Olsen played the starring role of John Michael Murphy in the 1981-83 NBC television drama series Father Murphy.

In the Highway to Heaven episode 2.12 ("The Good Doctor"), the main character, Alex, tells Mark Gordon (Victor French) that "All I could see was the flowers and the beard.  I thought you were Merlin Olsen." This is an inside joke since all three actors, Merlin Olsen, Michael Landon, and Victor French were in the TV series Little House On the Prairie  earlier in their careers.

Olsen's last acting work was in the short-lived 1988 TV series Aaron's Way''.

Olsen was also the commercial spokesman for FTD Florists for many years. A part-time resident of the Coachella Valley, Olsen was the longtime radio and television spokesman for Palm Desert-based El Paseo Bank.

Olsen also appeared in many Sigma Chi fraternity promotional campaigns; Merlin, along with his brother Phil, was a Life Loyal Sig, Significant Sig (given to members for distinguishing acts outside the fraternity) and a member of the Order of Constantine (given for service to the Fraternity). Olsen donated one of his cleats, which were bronzed, to be used during the annual football rivalry between two Las Vegas high schools, Eldorado High School and Chaparral High School, which both opened in 1973. Each year, Olsen presented the "trophy" in the ceremony at the rivalry game.

Olsen often co-hosted the Children's Miracle Network telethons, a humanitarian organization founded in 1983 by Marie Osmond and John Schneider.

Awards
He was named the Walter Camp Man of the Year in 1982 and Athlete of the Century for the state of Utah. During halftime of a basketball game between Utah State, Olsen's alma mater, and Saint Mary's on December 5, 2009, Utah State University announced that the playing surface inside Romney Stadium, home stadium for the university's football program, would be named Merlin Olsen Field in Olsen's honor. Because of Olsen's illness, Utah State decided not to wait until the 2010 football season to hold the ceremony; he was able to attend the game, but did not speak. A sculpture of Olsen was unveiled in a plaza south of the stadium during an official dedication ceremony in Fall 2010.

In 1979, Olsen was inducted into the Utah Sports Hall of Fame.

In 1980, Olsen was inducted into the National College Football Hall of Fame.

In 1998, Olsen was inducted into the Utah Tourism Hall of Fame.

Olsen was voted to the California Sports Hall of Fame Class of 2010, along with Bill Walton, Dwight Stones, and Jim Otto, among others.

In 1983, Olsen served as Grand Marshal of the Rose Parade.

Personal life
On March 30, 1962, Olsen married Susan Wakley, a fellow USU student. They had three children: Kelly, Jill, and Nathan. 
Olsen was a member of the Church of Jesus Christ of Latter-day Saints, and a resident of San Marino, California.

Olsen was diagnosed with peritoneal mesothelioma in 2009, and underwent three courses of chemotherapy. In December 2009, he filed a lawsuit against 25 defendants including NBC Studios, NBC Universal, 20th Century Fox, Georgia Pacific, Sherwin-Williams, and Lennox Corp. for allegedly exposing him to the asbestos which he claimed had caused his cancer.

Olsen died on March 11, 2010, at City of Hope National Medical Center in Duarte, California, at the age of 69.

Olsen is buried at San Gabriel Cemetery in San Gabriel, California.

Filmography

Film

Television

References

External links

 
 
 
 

1940 births
2010 deaths
20th-century American male actors
American football defensive tackles
American male television actors
American people of Danish descent
College football announcers
Canadian Football League announcers
Los Angeles Rams players
National Football League announcers
Utah State Aggies football players
All-American college football players
College Football Hall of Fame inductees
National Conference Pro Bowl players
Pro Football Hall of Fame inductees
Western Conference Pro Bowl players
People from Los Angeles County, California
Sportspeople from Logan, Utah
Players of American football from Utah
Male actors from Utah
American Latter Day Saints
Deaths from cancer in California
Deaths from mesothelioma
National Football League players with retired numbers